Delphinium or Delphinion was a town of ancient Chios located on the east side of the island, in a strong position, with harbours, and not far from the city of Chios. In preparation for the Siege of Chios during the Peloponnesian War, the Athenian admiral, Strombichides, fortified Delphinium (412/1 BCE).

Its site is located near modern .

References

Populated places in the ancient Aegean islands
Former populated places in Greece
Ancient Chios